A number of steamships were named Dea Mazzella, including:
, lost during World War II
, in service 1950–1956

Ship names